Winston Field Airport  is an airport located 2 miles southwest from Snyder, Texas. The airport was opened during July 1950. The airport normally handles about 31 aircraft every day.

References

External links 

Airports established in 1950
Airports in Texas
Transportation in Scurry County, Texas